Ursophyto is a genus of parasitic flies in the family Tachinidae.

Species
Ursophyto nigriceps (Bigot, 1889)

References

Dexiinae
Taxa named by John Merton Aldrich
Diptera of North America
Tachinidae genera